John Davies  (1862 – 1912) was a Welsh international footballer. He was part of the Wales national football team, playing 1 match on 14 March 1885 against England. At club level, he played for Oswestry.

See also
 List of Wales international footballers (alphabetical)

References

External links
 

1862 births
Welsh footballers
Wales international footballers
Oswestry Town F.C. players
Place of birth missing
Date of death missing
1912 deaths
Association football forwards